The 2003 Caribbean Football Union Club Championship was an international club football competition held in the Caribbean to determine the region's qualifier to the CONCACAF Champions' Cup. Seven teams from four football associations played in the 2003 edition, contested on a two-legged basis. A Round of 16 and a preliminary round were scheduled but never played due to 11 teams withdrawing from the competition.

The Trinidad and Tobago Professional Football League had the edge over the Jamaica National Premier League in the semifinals, winning both ties to set up an all-T&T final. San Juan Jabloteh finally beat W Connection on penalty kicks to advance to the 2004 CONCACAF Champions' Cup.

Withdrawn teams 
 Caribbean All Star
 Newtown United
 Village Superstars
 SUBT
 Robinhood
 Queens Park Rangers
 Fontenoy United
 Paradise
 Defence Force
 Pointe Michel
 Harlem United

Match

Preliminary round

First round

Second round

San Juan Jabloteh received a bye due on withdrawn  Fontenoy United or  Newtown United.

Semifinals

* both matches played at Manny Ramjohn Stadium in Marabella, Trinidad and Tobago.

Final 

 

San Juan Jabloteh 2003 CFU champions, advance to 2004 CONCACAF Champions' Cup quarterfinals.

Top scorers

External links
RSSSF's page about the tournament

2003
1